Slow Roast Records is an independent record label based out of Miami, Florida, US.

History 

Slow Roast Records was founded in 2009 by the 3x DMC World Champion DJ Craze and Kill the Noise. The Miami New Times acknowledges the record label's starting to make big waves in the independent scene in recent years saying, "After a couple of years of carefully cooking up the right beats, choosing the right artists, and prepping the right releases, Craze, Kill the Noise, and their genre-bending label hit it hard in 2013." Until recently, Slow Roast was distributed by their good friends at Fool's Gold Records.

Founders 

Craze was born in Nicaragua and grew up in Miami where he currently resides. He is known as one of the most accomplished turntablists of all time, having won over a dozen competition titles including a record three consecutive World DMC Championships. Craze also placed second in the 1999 DMC World Team Championships with his group The Allies (alongside fellow DMC World Champions A-Trak and Infamous) who took home the Team Championship the following year.
Kill The Noise, also known as Jake Stanczak or Ewun, is an electronic music producer from Rochester, NY currently living and working in Los Angeles, CA. After gaining critical success with his Ewun project, Jake Stanczak delved into the spacier dubstep realm to create Kill The Noise. Since, he has worked with Deadmau5's label Mau5trap and collaborated with Skrillex on four tracks: "Right on Time" and "Burst" with 12th Planet, "Narcissistic Cannibal" with Korn and "Recess" with Fatman Scoop and Michael Angelakos.

Roster 

 Ape Drums
 Brillz
 Codes
 DJ Craze
 Kill The Noise
 DJ Klever

Discography

References 

Record labels established in 2009